21 Down is a comic book published by WildStorm, and created by writers Justin Gray, Jimmy Palmiotti and artist Jesus Saiz.

Publication history
The title was an ongoing series published as a twelve-issue "season". Depending on sales, the creators hoped to produce a second season. They planned to start the second season in the Eye of the Storm but it never happened.

Plot
The comic tells the story of young Preston Kills, who could sense how people were going to die. Preston also knew that he was going to die at age 21, hence the title.

Collected editions
Part of the first "season" was collected as a trade paperback:

 The Conduit  (collects 21 Down #1-7, 176 pages, November 2003)

Notes

References

External links
21 Down at the Wildstorm Resource Wiki
The Conduit review at  The Fourth Rail

2002 comics debuts